Saint-Pierre-Toirac (Languedocien: Sant Pèire de Toirac) is a commune in the Lot department in south-western France.

See also
Communes of the Lot department

References

Saintpierretoirac